WRDO (96.9 FM) is a radio station broadcasting a classic hits format. It is licensed to Fitzgerald, Georgia, United States.  The station is currently owned by Broadcast South, LLC and features programming from the Tom Kent Radio Network distributed through United Stations Radio Networks.

The station is managed by Micky Helms, a well-known radio personality and resident of Fitzgerald, Georgia. Helms, along with different guests, hosts a daily morning show 6-10am EST.

Along with programming from the Tom Kent Radio Network, WRDO hosts many different shows and programs from Ben Hill County and surrounding areas including high school football, church services, and community/commerce services.

History of call letters
The call letters WRDO were previously assigned to an AM station in Augusta, Maine, operating on 1400 kHz with 1000 W power.

On January 1, 2016, WRDO changed their format from soft adult contemporary to classic hits.

References

External links

RDO